Augusto Valentín Vizcarrondo was a Puerto Rican politician who served as mayor of Mayagüez from 1953 to 1956.  He was also known as Tuto Valentín.

References 

Popular Democratic Party (Puerto Rico) politicians
Mayors of Mayagüez, Puerto Rico